Yūkyō Gonin Otoko  (unofficial English title: Magnificent Five) is a 1958 Japanese film.

Cast 
 Kazuo Hasegawa
 Raizo Ichikawa as Heizaburo Tsumaki
 Shintaro Katsu

References

External links 
  http://www.raizofan.net/link4/movie2/yukyo.htm

1958 films
Daiei Film films
1950s Japanese films